Delta Hydrae, Latinized from δ Hydrae, is a double star in the equatorial constellation of Hydra. It is visible to the naked eye with an apparent visual magnitude of 4.146. Based upon an annual parallax shift of 20.34 mas, it is located about 160 light years from the Sun.

The brighter component is an A-type main sequence star with a stellar classification of A1 Vnn. It is spinning rapidly with a projected rotational velocity of 285 km/s. This is giving the star an oblate shape with an equatorial bulge that is 20% larger than the polar radius. It has an estimated 2.88 times the mass of the Sun and 2.7 times the Sun's radius. The star is about 244 million years old and it radiates 42.7 times the solar luminosity from its outer atmosphere at an effective temperature of 11,055 K.

The companion has a visual magnitude of 11.15. X-ray emissions have been detected from this location in space, which may be coming from a companion star.

Name and etymology
In the catalogue of stars in the Calendarium of Al Achsasi Al Mouakket, this star was designated Lisan al Shudja, which was translated into Latin as Lingua Hydri, meaning the snake's tongue. This star, along with ε Hya, ζ Hya, η Hya, ρ Hya and σ Hya (Minchir), were Ulugh Beg's Min al Azʽal, "Belonging to the Uninhabited Spot".

According to the catalogue of stars in the Technical Memorandum 33-507 - A Reduced Star Catalog Containing 537 Named Stars, Min al Azʽal or Minazal were the title for five stars :δ Hya as Minazal I, η Hya as Minazal II, ε Hya as Minazal III, ρ Hya as Minazal IV and ζ Hya as Minazal V (exclude σ Hya)

The people of Groote Eylandt called Unwala, "The Crab", for the star cluster including this star, ε Hya, ζ Hya, η Hya, ρ Hya and σ Hya (Minchir).

References

External links

A-type main-sequence stars
Hydrae, Delta
Hydra (constellation)
Hydrae, 04
073262
042313
3401
Durchmusterung objects
Minazal I